"A m'don" is a song recorded by Albanian singer and songwriter Elvana Gjata. The song was written by the aforementioned artist together with Albanian composer Arber Zeqo. Beside that it was produced by Albanian producer Arbre Blass, and both mastered and mixed by Swedish producer Johan Bejerholm. In its romantic love-inspired lyrics, the Albanian-language song discusses the theme of sensual desire and Elvana's aspiration for her love interest. An official music video was filmed in Turkey and depicts Elvana being surrounded by females of different ethnicities, body shapes and sizes performing the song in a garden of a mansion in Istanbul.

Background and composition 

"A m'don" has a running time of three minutes and nine seconds, and was written by Elvana herself together with Arber Zeqo. Its production was handled by Arbre Blass while being mastered and mixed by Johan Bejerholm. In regard to the music notation, it was composed in  time performed in the key of A minor in common time with an allegretto tempo of 113 beats per minute. Characterised as a pop song, it lyrically focuses on Elvana's desire and references to romance as she asks her love interest whether he still loves her despite her absence. Lyrics of "A m'don" include, "My soul can't sleep peacefully [...] but I need to know if you still love me — do you have something to tell me?".

Music video 

The accompanying music video for "A m'don" was officially premiered onto Elvana Gjata's YouTube channel on 8 August 2019, where it has since amassed more than 20 million views. It was directed by her recent collaborator Emir Khalilzadeh, who previously directed her music video for "Fustani". Cansu Yilmaz and Ceyhun Sevil acted as the video producers, while Emre Karbek was hired as the director of photography.

Filmed in the city of Istanbul, Elvana is prominently shown with multiple other females of different ethnicities, body shapes and sizes. The music video commences with a blurred shot of Elvana behind a white curtain, and switches to two separate females walking into the key location. As the video progresses, the singer is shown wearing a white cropped playsuit while dancing to the song in front of three columns between white-hanging curtains. Over the rest of the video, the cameras display Elvana accompanied by the two women sitting on pool stairs, and lying on a white blanket.

Personnel 

Credits adapted from Tidal and YouTube.

 Elvana Gjataperforming, songwriting, vocals
 Arber Zeqosongwriting
 Johan Bejerholmmixing and mastering
 Emir Khalilzadehvideo directing
 Cansu Yilmazvideo production
 Ceyhun Sevilvideo production
 Emre Karbekphoto directing
 Özkan Aksularediting

Track listing 

Digital download
"A m'don"3:08

Charts

Release history

References 

2019 singles
2019 songs
Elvana Gjata songs
Albanian-language songs
Pop songs
Songs written by Elvana Gjata